Music from the Motion Picture The Dictator is the soundtrack to Larry Charles's 2012 film The Dictator. It was released on May 8, 2012 via (the fictional) Aladeen Records. The majority of the songs are sung in Wadiyan despite it being a fictional language; however, it is closely associated with the German, Hungarian, and Arabic languages.

Primarily produced by Erran Baron Cohen, Peter Amato, George Drakoulias and Robert Berry, the album features contributions from film star Admiral General Aladeen, along with Jalal el Hamdaoui, Ali Hassan Kuban, Khaled, Omar Fadel and Souad Massi among others.

Track listing

Charts

References 

2012 soundtrack albums 
Comedy film soundtracks
Albums produced by George Drakoulias